Amin Gazi is an Indian Actor. He was seen in 2001 Film Lagaan and 2003 Comedy Film Hungama

References

External links

Living people
Male actors from Mumbai
1988 births